Yipintianxia is a transfer station on Line 2 and Line 7 of the Chengdu Metro in China.

Station layout

Gallery

References

Railway stations in Sichuan
Railway stations in China opened in 2012
Chengdu Metro stations